The Federal Ministry of the Interior and Community (abbreviated , is a cabinet-level ministry of the Federal Republic of Germany. Its main office is in Berlin, with a secondary seat in Bonn. The current minister is Nancy Faeser. 
It is comparable to the British Home Office or a combination of the US Department of Homeland Security and the US Department of Justice, because both manage several law enforcement agencies. The BMI is tasked with the internal security of Germany. To fulfill this responsibility it maintains, among other agencies, the two biggest federal law enforcement agencies in Germany, the Federal Police (including the GSG 9) and the Federal Criminal Police Office. It is also responsible for the federal domestic intelligence agency, the Federal Office for the Protection of the Constitution.

History 
The Reichsamt des Innern (Imperial Office of the Interior) was the Ministry of the Interior of the German Empire. On the proposal of the Reichskanzler Otto von Bismarck it was created on 24 December 1879 by an Imperial decree from the Reich Chancellery. Like the other Imperial Offices it was directly under the control of the Reichskanzler. The seat of the office was in Berlin and it was managed by a Secretary of State, who from 1881 until 1916 also simultaneously held the office of Vice-Chancellor. The gazette for the publication of official notices was run by the Office from 1880. Entitled the Zentralblatt für das Deutsche Reich (ZBl), it had been published by the Reich Chancellery from 1873 until 1879.

With the Law on the Provisional Imperial Government of 11 February 1919, the Imperial Office became the Reichsministerium des Innern (RMI) (Ministry of the Interior) which remained the German Ministry of the Interior during the Weimar Republic and Nazi Germany. From 1923 until 1945, the ministry published the government gazette, which was entitled the Reichsministerialblatt (RMBl). On 1 November 1934 it was united with the Prussian Ministry of the Interior as the Reichs- und Preußischen Ministerium des Innern (Imperial and Prussian Ministry of the Interior).

In 1949, the Imperial Ministry of the Interior (effectively defunct since the end of the war in Europe in 1945) was succeeded by the present Federal Ministry, though it served as the Interior Ministry for West Germany only until German reunification in 1990. From 1949 to 1970, 54% of the ministry's department leaders were former Nazi Party members, their share peaking at 66% in 1961.

Under the Fourth Merkel cabinet, which took office in February 2018, the Ministry of the Interior was merged with the building department, which had been included in the ministry of transport from 1998 to 2013, and the environment ministry from 2013 to 2018. The ministry, headed by the former Bavarian minister-president Horst Seehofer, was then renamed to "Interior, Building and Homeland". The renaming was controversial as some interpreted the term Heimat as old-fashioned or even nationalistic.

Responsibilities 
The Ministry of the Interior is responsible for internal security and the protection of the constitutional order, for civil protection against disasters and terrorism, for displaced persons, administrative questions, and sports. It is host to the Standing Committee of Interior Ministers and also drafts all passport, identity card, firearms, and explosives legislation.
The ministry also houses the Joint Anti-Terrorism Center formed in 2004 which is an information-sharing and analytical forum for all German police and intelligence agencies involved in the fight against terrorism.

Organization

State Secretaries 
The minister is supported by two parliamentary state secretaries and five state secretaries who manage the ministry's various departments.

Departments 
state secretaries #1 and #2
"P" Department (Abteilung P) is the ministry's police department and has two branches: law enforcement and counter-terrorism. It analyses crime control issues and develops concepts and drafts laws to improve law enforcement and crime prevention efforts. It also manages the Federal Criminal Police Office, coordinates police support group deployments and represents federal interests in the sport and security arena. Due to Germany's federal structure, it can only promote internal security and public safety by cooperating with the state police forces and with agencies within the European Union (EU) and beyond.
"IS" Department (Abteilung IS) is the internal security department that protects the German state against political extremism. It exercises supervisory control over the Federal Office for Constitution Protection, studies extremist groups and can ban them as a final resort. In addition, the department is responsible for the security of classified information and prevention of sabotage and espionage. It also manages civil defense and emergency management efforts at the national level and exercises supervisory control over the Civil Protection Center and Federal Agency for Technical Relief.
"B" Department (Abteilung B) supervises and manages German Federal Police operations.
"M" Department (Abteilung M) is responsible for immigration, integration, refugees and European harmonisation.
"Z" Department (Abteilung Z) is the central office.
"D" Department (Abteilung D) is responsible for the civil service.
"O" Department (Abteilung O) is responsible for administrative modernisation and organisation.
"V" Department (Abteilung V) is responsible for constitutional, state, administrative and European law.
state secretary #3
"G" Department (Abteilung G) is responsible for policy, Europe and international developments
"H" Department (Abteilung H) is responsible for society affairs 
"SP" Department (Abteilung SP) is responsible for sport.
state secretary #4
department digital society
department digital state 
department cyber security 
state secretary #5
2 departments on construction, housing and public buildings

Special agencies

See also
List of German interior ministers

References

External links 
 
 

Interior
Germany
Germany, Interior
Emergency management in Germany
National security institutions